Phase 3: Thrones and Dominions is a studio album by the drone band Earth, released in 1995.

Critical reception

Spin deemed the album "stoner-metal Muzak that's as soothing as it is disturbing."

AllMusic lamented that "there are plenty of excellent ideas—stellar, half-written song structures that are never granted the proper completion or percussive accompaniment."

Track listing

Personnel
Dylan Carlson – guitars, percussion
Tommy Hansen – guitar

References

1995 albums
Earth (American band) albums
Sub Pop albums